The 2009 Ligue 2 season was the first of the professional competition of the second-tier football in Senegal.  The tournament was organized by the Senegalese Football Federation  The season began a little earlier on Saturday 2 May and finished on 16 October.  It was the first season labelled as a "League" ("Ligue" in French).  AS Pikine and ASC Niarry Tally were promoted into Ligue 1 the following season while ASC Xam Xam was relegated into National 1 the following season.  Pikine had the highest with 42 points while ASC Niarry Tally was second with 40 points,  scoring the most goals, numbering 32.

Geographically almost all clubs were in the western and westernmost parts of the country, two or three of the clubs were not of the Dakar area.

Unlike Ligue 1, there was no group system used in the season, the following year, Ligue 2 would have a group system where the club with the highest number of points was elevated into Ligue 1 in the 2011 season and the lowest relegated into National 1 in the 2011 season.

Participating clubs

Overview
The league was contested by 12 teams.

League standings

Top scorers

References

Senegal
2008–09 in Senegalese football
Ligue 2 (Senegal)